This list of medical specialty colleges in the United States includes medical societies that represent board certified specialist physicians.  The American Medical Association maintains a list of societies represented in its House of Delegates, while the American Association of Colleges of Osteopathic Medicine maintains a list of osteopathic specialty colleges. The American Association of Physician Specialists maintains a list of specialties colleges open to physicians with either M.D. or D.O. degrees. Some societies are not affiliated with these associations.

List

See also
 Board certification
 Medical education in the United States

References

External links
 AMA: National medical specialty society websites
 AACOM: Osteopathic specialty colleges
 AAPS: Academies of the American Association of Physician Specialists